The Lebensversicherung von 1871 a. G. München (LV 1871) is a German life insurance company founded in 1871 and headquartered in Munich. LV 1871 specialises in life, pension and disability insurance. As a mutual insurance association, LV 1871 is exclusively committed to its customers. The company relies on approximately 8,500 independent insurance brokers to advise its customers.

General Information 
The LV 1871 company group is managed by: CEO Wolfgang Reichel; Klaus Math, responsible for products, underwriting and IT; and Hermann Schrögenauer, in charge of sales and marketing. The chairman of the supervisory board is Peter Hohenemser.

The following subsidiaries are wholly owned by the parent company Lebensversicherung von 1871 a.G. München:

 Delta Direkt Lebensversicherung AG Munich, Munich
 LV 1871 Pensionsfonds AG, Triesen (Liechtenstein), founded in 2007
 LV 1871 Private Assurance AG, Triesen (Liechtenstein), established in 2008
 Magnus GmbH, Munich, Germany
 TRIAS Versicherung AG, Munich, Germany

Company History 

 In 1871, the "Christkatholischer Begräbniß-Verein" (Catholic Funeral Association) was founded by a group of Munich citizens to ensure a dignified funeral for its members.
 By 1927, the number of members had risen to 140,000. In that same year, the institution was converted into a mutual insurance association.
 In 1929, in addition to the traditional funeral insurance, the association started in the life insurance business.
 By 1933, the number of members had risen to 400,000. In 1938 the association was forced by the rulers of the Third Reich to rename itself and from then on operated under the name "Münchener Begräbnisverein" (Munich Funeral Association).
 In July 1945, two months after the end of World War II, the association resumed business operations at Sendlinger Strasse 55 in Munich.
 In 1954 the association had a portfolio of 1.1 million insurance contracts.
 In 1969, the company renamed itself to "Lebensversicherung von 1871 a.G. München" to reflect the growing share of life insurance policies in its portfolio.
 In 1977, the former Regina Palace Hotel at Maximiliansplatz 5, now referred to as the Regina-Haus (Regina House), became the new headquarters.
 In 1987, the company choose a new image and a new logo (a stylised version of the symbol of Munich, the "Frauenkirche" (Cathedral of Our Dear Lady) to express ist loyalty to its founding home, the city of Munich.
 In 1993, shortly before the completion of the European Single Market, LV 1871 launched new products such as supplementary long-term care insurance as part of an overall pension plan, disability insurance for the self-employed including a premium reimbursement guarantee, and critical illness insurance policies with capital advance in the case of serious illnesses.
 In 1999, LV 1871 launched "eXtra-Rente", an innovative pension insurance, which was awarded the Capital Innovation Prize for insurance.
 In January 2013, the trade journals Euro and Euro am Sonntag award the Golden Bull for the "4flex" product. Customers can choose between a classic retirement or a lump-sum payment, as well as between "eXtraRenten" (supplementary retirement income) or a long-term care insurance plan. In the event of a serious illness or the need for long-term care, the pension is flexibly adjusted.

External links 

 Lebensversicherung von 1871 a. G. München
 Lebensversicherung von 1871 a. G. München in the BaFin company database

Sources 

Financial services companies established in 1871
Financial services companies based in Munich
1871 establishments
Insurance companies of Germany
Mutual insurance companies